Silver Columns is the collaborative effort of Johnny Lynch, aka The Pictish Trail (of the Fence Collective) and Adem Ilhan, bassist in post-rock outfit Fridge.

After releasing the singles "Brow Beaten" and "Yes, and Dance" anonymously, Silver Columns made their live debut at Fence Records’ annual hootenanny, Homegame in 2010 and continued to appear at festivals and venues throughout the year. They released the album Yes, and Dance in May 2010

Scottish musical duos
Male musical duos